Judd–Ofelt theory is a theory in physical chemistry describing the intensity of electron transitions within the 4f shell of rare-earth ions in solids and solutions.

The theory was introduced independently in 1962 by Brian R. Judd of the University of California, Berkeley, and PhD candidate George S. Ofelt at Johns Hopkins University. Their work was published in Physical Review and the Journal of Chemical Physics, respectively.
Judd and Ofelt did not meet until 2003 at a workshop in Lądek-Zdrój, Poland.

Judd and Ofelt's work was cited approximately 2000 times between 1962 and 2004. Brian M. Walsh of NASA Langley places Judd and Ofelt's theory at the "forefront" of a 1960s revolution in spectroscopic research on rare-earth ions.

Theory

Application software
Judd–Ofelt intensity parameters from absorption spectrum of any lanthanide can be calculated by the RELIC application software.
Judd–Ofelt intensity parameters and derived quantities (oscillator strengths, radiative transition probabilities, luminescence branching ratios, excited state radiative lifetimes, and estimates of quantum efficiencies) from the emission spectrum of Eu3+ doped compounds, can be obtained by the JOES application software.

See also
Parity (physics)
Bert Broer
Otto Laporte
Giulio Racah
John Hasbrouck Van Vleck
Eugene Wigner
Brian Garner Wybourne

References

Atomic physics
Electron states
Physical chemistry
1962 introductions